Gerrit Lamberts (1776–1850) was a Dutch painter and curator of the Rijksmuseum when it was located in the Trippenhuis.

Lamberts was born in Amsterdam. He started out as a merchant selling paper and later became a watercolorist, draughtsman and engraver. He is known for topographic drawings of cityscapes, architectural views of buildings and his watercolors of art galleries. He was also a bookseller and became the curator of the museum in Amsterdam in 1825. He was a member of the Amsterdam academy which was housed in the same building.

Images 
Two of the main display rooms of the Trippenhuis-Museum

Two views of the print room of the Trippenhuis-Museum

His views of the print room include a self-portrait, and the paintings hanging on the walls were modern works that later were moved to the Paviljoen Welgelegen in Haarlem, which became the national museum of "living masters", or modern art.
He wrote a catalog of the book collection of Jacobus Koning (1770-1832) in 1833.
Lamberts died in Amsterdam.

References

 Gerrit Lamberts biography in the NNBW
 Collection of views of Amsterdam by Gerrit Lamberts in the Stadsarchief Amsterdam

1776 births
1850 deaths
Painters from Amsterdam
Dutch painters
Dutch male painters
Directors of museums in Amsterdam